Mashtots Avenue ( Mashtots'i Poghota), known as Lenin Avenue until 1990, is an avenue in the central Kentron district of Yerevan, Armenia.

The avenue starts with the Victory Bridge at the south and ends up with the Matenadaran museum  to the north.

Notable buildings
Many prominent buildings in the city of Yerevan are located on the Mashtots Avenue. Below is a list of significant structures located on the avenue (from north to south):

Blue Mosque (1768)
Eduard Isabekyan Gallery (2007)
Yerevan Opera Theater (1933)
Nairi Cinema (1954)
Matenadaran (1959)
President's Residence (1985)
Yerevan State Marionettes Theatre (1987)

Gallery

References

Transport in Yerevan
Roads in Armenia
Streets in Yerevan